The Communauté de communes de l'Hesdinois was located in the Pas-de-Calais département, in northern France. It was created in January 2002. It was merged into the new Communauté de communes des 7 Vallées in January 2014.

Composition
It comprised the following 27 communes:

Aubin-Saint-Vaast 
Auchy-lès-Hesdin 
Bouin-Plumoison 
Brévillers 
Capelle-lès-Hesdin  
Caumont  
Cavron-Saint-Martin  
Chériennes  
Contes  
Grigny  
Guigny 
Guisy
Hesdin
Huby-Saint-Leu  
La Loge
Labroye  
Le Parcq 
Le Quesnoy-en-Artois  
Marconne  
Marconnelle  
Mouriez  
Raye-sur-Authie 
Regnauville 
Sainte-Austreberthe  
Tortefontaine  
Wambercourt  
Wamin

References 

Hesdinois